Group 7 of the UEFA Euro 1968 qualifying tournament was one of the eight groups to decide which teams would qualify for the UEFA Euro 1968 finals tournament. Group 7 consisted of four teams: France, Belgium, Poland, and Luxembourg, where they played against each other home-and-away in a round-robin format. The group winners were France, who finished 2 points above Belgium.

Final table

Matches

Goalscorers

References
 
 
 

Group 1
1966–67 in French football
1967–68 in French football
1966–67 in Belgian football
1967–68 in Belgian football
1966–67 in Polish football
1967–68 in Polish football